Armin Gremsl (born 13 August 1994) is an Austrian footballer who plays as a goalkeeper for German  club Arminia Bielefeld.

Club career
On 6 February 2022, Gremsl signed with Rheindorf Altach until the end of the 2021–22 season.

On 27 January 2023, Gremsl moved to Arminia Bielefeld in Germany.

Career statistics

References

External links
 
 

1994 births
Living people
Austrian footballers
Austrian expatriate footballers
2. Liga (Austria) players
Cypriot First Division players
Floridsdorfer AC players
FC Juniors OÖ players
TSV Hartberg players
SV Horn players
Doxa Katokopias FC players
SKN St. Pölten players
Liga I players
FC U Craiova 1948 players
SC Rheindorf Altach players
Arminia Bielefeld players
Place of birth missing (living people)
Association football goalkeepers
Austrian expatriate sportspeople in Cyprus
Expatriate footballers in Cyprus
Austrian expatriate sportspeople in Romania
Expatriate footballers in Romania
Austrian expatriate sportspeople in Germany
Expatriate footballers in Germany